Classic Motorsports is an American periodical devoted to classic cars, classic car restoration and vintage racing. It was established in 1986 and is published six times a year. The magazine's parent company, Motorsport Marketing Inc., based in Holly Hill, Florida, also publishes Grassroots Motorsports magazine.

Classic Motorsports focuses primarily on how enthusiasts of any means can own and enjoy classic automobiles. The magazine emphasizes that classic cars are meant to be driven rather than displayed or put in storage. Therefore, editorial often revolves around how to participate in vintage racing events, concours events and enthusiast gatherings as well as classic car rallies and tours. Each issue contains coverage of such events held throughout the United States.

The magazine also includes technical articles on how to maintain, restore and upgrade these cars. Buyers guides, car-and-owner profiles, historical features and driving impressions appear frequently. It is the largest publication of its kind in the United States and is the official publication of Historic Sportscar Racing (HSR).

Project cars
The editorial focuses on a wide variety of staff-owned classics, usually with a hands-on point of view. Current Classic Motorsports project cars include a 1964 Lotus Elan and a 1967 Austin Mini Cooper S.

Sanctioned events
Classic Motorsports also actively supports classic car clubs and events. The magazine is the title sponsor of the Classic Motorsports Mitty, a classic car event held annually at the Road Atlanta race track in Braselton, Georgia. Historic Sportscar Racing sanctions The Mitty's vintage racing, while sister publication Grassroots Motorsports hosts an event in the infield called Speedfest.

In March 2010, Classic Motorsports hosted its first Orange Blossom Tour. The event was billed as a back-roads classic car tour through Old Florida. Between its starting point at the Amelia Island Concours and its 12 Hours of Sebring destination, the drive featured several stops. These included the Brumos Porsche Collection, an eco-tour on the Dora Canal, and the Castillo de San Marcos fort. The tour raised nearly $2000 for the Amelia Island Foundation to benefit Hospice.

Since then, the Orange Blossom Tour has become an annual event. The tour is limited to 25 cars each year in order to keep it intimate. The 2016 Orange Blossom Tour will begin and end in Fernandina Beach on Amelia Island. Every route is different, but as usual the tour highlights some of northern Florida's most scenic routes and classic dining experiences.

References

External links
 
 Classic Motorsports Project Cars

1986 establishments in Florida
Automobile magazines published in the United States
Bimonthly magazines published in the United States
Conservation and restoration of vehicles
Magazines established in 1986
Magazines published in Florida